Howick may refer to:

Places
Howick, KwaZulu-Natal, in South Africa
Howick Falls
Howick, Lancashire, a small hamlet (Howick Cross) and former civil parish in England
Howick, New Zealand
Howick Historical Village
Howick (New Zealand electorate), a former parliamentary electorate, 1993–1996
Howick ward, electoral district of Auckland Council
Howick, Northumberland, a village in England
Howick Hall, a stately home
Howick house, a Mesolithic site
Howick, Ontario, Canada
Howick, Quebec, Canada
Howick, Western Australia, in the Shire of Esperance, Australia
Howick Group National Park
Howick Island, Australia

People
Baron Howick of Glendale
Baron Grey of Howick and Viscount Howick (in Northumberland), subsidiary titles of Earl Grey
Jeremy Howick

Other uses
USS Howick Hall (ID-1303), a United States Navy ship

See also
 Hawick, a town in the Scottish Borders council area